Chimney Hill [alt. ] in Pontotoc County, Oklahoma was a landmark on the old California Road. It was identified on old maps as Natural Mound. Its prominence made it a major reference point for many surveys and in 1920 it became the site of the U.S. Coast and Geodetic Survey Mound Triangulation Station.

External links

Map: 

Landforms of Pontotoc County, Oklahoma
Landmarks in Oklahoma
Hills of Oklahoma